The 1999 Fall Brawl was the seventh Fall Brawl professional wrestling pay-per-view (PPV) event produced by World Championship Wrestling (WCW). It took place on September 12, 1999 from the Lawrence Joel Veterans Memorial Coliseum in Winston-Salem, North Carolina. As of 2014 the event is available on the WWE Network.

Production

Background
The WarGames match was created when Dusty Rhodes was inspired by a viewing of Mad Max Beyond Thunderdome. It was originally used as a specialty match for the Four Horsemen. The first WarGames match took place at The Omni in Atlanta during the NWA's Great American Bash '87 tour, where it was known as War Games: The Match Beyond. It became a traditional Fall Brawl event from 1993 to 1998. This was the first Fall Brawl not to have a War Games Match.

Storylines
The event featured professional wrestling matches that involve different wrestlers from pre-existing scripted feuds and storylines. Professional wrestlers portray villains, heroes, or less distinguishable characters in the scripted events that build tension and culminate in a wrestling match or series of matches.

Event

Berlyn was originally supposed to face Buff Bagwell, but the storyline was that Bagwell was late in arriving. In reality, Bagwell had refused to lose the match. Instead Berlyn wrestled against Jim Duggan. In the main event Sting put an unconscious Hulk Hogan in the Scorpion Deathlock after knocking him out with a baseball bat and Hogan failed to respond to his arm being raised three times by referee Charles Robinson. The outcome of the match played out due to large amounts of interference. Diamond Dallas Page was the first to interfere, attacking referee Nick Patrick and then hit the Diamond Cutter on Hogan. After Hogan kicked out Page attacked Patrick with the Diamond Cutter and took him out of the match. Bret Hart then came out to attack Page while Hogan forced Sting to the outside. Sid Vicious entered the ring to attack Hogan but was quickly taken out with the Big Boot. Hogan then intercepted a bat-wielding Lex Luger as he tried to interfere; Sting then took the bat after Luger had dropped it and assaulted Hogan with it. After the match, Sting and Luger celebrated in the middle of the ring.

Reception
In 2007, Arnold Furious of 411Mania gave the event a rating of 2.0 [Very Bad], stating, "In terms of delivering tonight’s matches went 0 for 9. That has to be worth some sort of special mention. Hey, you’ll never believe how awful the WCW PPV was! This one is to be avoided at all costs. There’s nothing to redeem it."

Results

References

Professional wrestling in North Carolina
Events in North Carolina
1999 in North Carolina
Fall Brawl
September 1999 events in the United States
1999 World Championship Wrestling pay-per-view events